Pelocetus is an extinct genus of baleen whale, belonging to the family Pelocetidae. Fossils have been found in Miocene-aged marine strata in North America.

References

Miocene cetaceans
Miocene mammals of North America
Miocene genus extinctions
Prehistoric cetacean genera
Fossil taxa described in 1965